Schaumburg Castle (German: Burg Schaumburg) is a castle in the town of Rinteln in the district of Schaumburg in Lower Saxony, Germany. It is owned by the former ruling family of Schaumburg-Lippe.

History
The castle became the property of the Hohenzollerns when George William, Prince of Schaumburg-Lippe sided with the Austrians in the 1866 Austro-Prussian War.

However, in 1907, Emperor Wilhelm II returned Schaumburg Castle to George, Prince of Schaumburg-Lippe on the occasion of his silver wedding anniversary. The gift was also meant to be in recognition of Georg's support in the dispute over the succession to the throne of Lippe-Detmold. The castle is currently owned by the Head of the House, Alexander, Prince of Schaumburg-Lippe.

References

External links 
 https://www.ndr.de/ratgeber/reise/weser_weserbergland/Burg-Schaumburg-Weitblick-ins-Wesertal,schaumburg101.html (in German)

Castles in Lower Saxony